Süderoog (North Frisian: Saruug or Saaruuch) is one of the Halligen, a group of islands in the North Frisian Wadden Sea, off the west coast of Schleswig-Holstein in north Germany. It belongs administratively to the parish of Pellworm and is a bird reserve.

Before the Burchardi flood in 1634 there were three houses on the island, one of which was inhabited by the beach lookout (Strandvogt). He was also the caretaker of the beacon, which was destroyed during the storm surge of 1634. In this storm tide, two houses were destroyed and ten people were drowned. In the February flood of 1825 the last remaining house was destroyed. It was rebuilt, however, and served again as the residence of the lookout.

The most famous resident of the island was Hermann Paulsen Neuton who, from 1927 until his death in 1951, ran an international youth meeting place, the "Island of Boys." (Insel der Jungen). It was continued after his death by his wife, Gunvor, and in 1960, converted into a foundation, whose aim was "on the basis of Hermann Neuton Paulsen's work and in the interests of international understanding, to give young people from different countries the opportunity to meet on the island of Süderoog in an atmosphere of freedom borne out of responsibility, to get to know one another as friends, and to live together in ways that are to match the development of psychology and pedagogy at any time. "(§ 2 of the Foundation's Charter, Stockholm, 22 February 1960).

Difficult sanitary conditions, which could not be sufficiently improved, and damage caused by the flood of 1962 led to the gradual decline of Süderoog's holiday work. The Hallig that had been in the private ownership of the Paulsen family for centuries was finally sold in 1971 to the state of Schleswig-Holstein. In 1974 the foundation was dissolved.

Süderoog is inhabited by a couple who rent the Hallig from the state of Schleswig-Holstein. Both are active in coastal protection and look after the preservation of the island. Access to Süderoog is only possible as part of a guided tour from Pellworm.

External links 

 Information on Süderoog 

Halligen
Bird reserves in Schleswig-Holstein
Islands of Schleswig-Holstein
Pellworm